Burlesque Fairytales is a 2009 British thriller film written and directed by Susan Luciani set in a fictional 1930s London theatre starring an ensemble cast led by Benedict Cumberbatch, Lindsay Duncan and Jim Carter. The film's premiere was held at  Seattle's True Independent Film Festival on 7 June 2009.

Cast
 Anna Andresen as The Mermaid
 Esmé Bianco as Mother
 Stephen Campbell Moore as Peter Blythe-Smith
 Jim Carter as The Compere
 Benedict Cumberbatch as Henry Clark
 Lindsay Duncan as Ice Queen
 Barbara Flynn as Mrs Argyle
 Mona Hammond as Death's Wife
 Kevin Howarth as Jimmy Harrison
 Sophie Hunter as Annabel Blythe-Smith

Production
Produced by Double Barrel Productions, the film is Susan Luciani's directorial debut and was shot in 19 days at Pinewood Studios.

References

External links 

2009 thriller drama films
2009 films
British thriller drama films
Films shot in Buckinghamshire
2009 drama films
2000s English-language films
2000s British films